Boston Drops the Gloves: A Tribute to Slapshot is a tribute album to Boston hardcore punk band Slapshot. It was released in 1999 on TKO Records and features Slapshot covers by 22 Boston area punk bands.

Track listing

References

1999 compilation albums
Tribute albums
Punk rock compilation albums